Shin Byung-kook (born 19 December 1978) is a South Korean biathlete. He competed in the men's 20 km individual event at the 2002 Winter Olympics.

References

1978 births
Living people
South Korean male biathletes
Olympic biathletes of South Korea
Biathletes at the 2002 Winter Olympics
Sportspeople from Gangwon Province, South Korea
Asian Games medalists in biathlon
Biathletes at the 1999 Asian Winter Games
Biathletes at the 2003 Asian Winter Games
Asian Games silver medalists for South Korea
Asian Games bronze medalists for South Korea
Medalists at the 1999 Asian Winter Games
Medalists at the 2003 Asian Winter Games
20th-century South Korean people
21st-century South Korean people